Clinical Pharmacology & Therapeutics is a monthly peer-reviewed medical journal which covers research on the nature, action, efficacy, and evaluation of therapeutics. The editor-in-chief is Piet van der Graaf (Cetara). The journal was established in 1960 and is published by Wiley-Blackwell. It is an official journal of the American Society for Clinical Pharmacology & Therapeutics.

Abstracting and indexing 
The journal is abstracted and indexed in:
 Chemical Abstracts Service
 Current Contents/Clinical Medicine
 Current Contents/Life Sciences
 BIOSIS Previews
 EBSCO databases
 Index Medicus/MEDLINE/PubMed
 Science Citation Index
 Scopus
According to the Journal Citation Reports, the journal has a 2020 impact factor of 6.875, ranking it 19th out of 275 journals in the category "Pharmacology & Pharmacy".

References

External links 
 
American Society for Clinical Pharmacology & Therapeutics

Pharmacology journals
Monthly journals
Wiley-Blackwell academic journals
Publications established in 1960
English-language journals